Stanisław Szymański (June 17, 1930, in Kraków – February 10, 1999, in Warsaw) was Polish ballet dancer. In the years 1967–1985, he was the premier danseur of the Grand Theatre, Warsaw.

Life 
Szymański was a student of the  School of Artistic Dance in Cracow, where he also studied under Leon Woizikovsky. It was Woizikovsky who finally brought him to Warsaw, where in 1948–1950 he performed in the musical ensemble of Teatr Nowy. In the 1950/51 season he was a ballet soloist at the Poznań Opera, where he also worked under the direction of Leon Woizikovsky. After being drafted into the army in 1951, he performed in the Song and Dance Ensemble of the House of the Polish Army in Warsaw. From 1956 he was a soloist of the ballet of the State Opera in Warsaw, and from 1965 of the ballet of the Grand Theater in Warsaw, where in the years 1967–1985 he held the title of principal dancer.

In 1963, during the Warsaw Autumn festival, he received the SPAM "Orpheus" music critics award for his performance of the part of Orpheus in Igor Stravinsky's ballet. However, he became famous above all in demi-classical solo dances, in which he demonstrated technical freedom, dizzying pirouettes, height and lightness of the jump. The audience almost always enthusiastically greeted his every appearance on stage. Many of his performances (especially in 's contemporary ballets) have been captured on film. He performed for the last time in 1994 at the Studio Theater in 's Four Parallel Comedies. As one of the few artists of his time, he did not hide his homosexuality and became an icon of the LGBT communityHe was buried along "Avenue of the Distinguished" on Powązki cemetery.

Awards and honors 

 1954: Golden Cross of Merit
 1959:  in Paris
 1963: Musical Critics award „Orpheus” for playing Orpheus in Stravinsky's ballet
 1967: 2nd rank Award of Ministry of Culture and Arts
 1971: Officer's Cross of Order of Polonia Restituta
 1974: Polish State Award Badge, 2nd rank

References

Bibliography 
 Małgorzata Komorowska, Paweł Chynowski, Sztuka naturalna Stanisława Szymańskiego. Szkic do portretu, „Taniec”, Polski Teatr Tańca, Poznań 1980, s. 23–29.
 Irena Turska, Almanach baletu polskiego, 1945–1974, Polskie Wydawnictwo Muzyczne, Kraków 1983, s. 180, 
 Barbara Krzemień-Kołpanowicz, Szymański Stanisław, Encyklopedia muzyczna PWM, t. 10, Polskie Wydawnictwo Muzyczne, Kraków 1997, s. 301,  t. 10
  Irena Turska, Przewodnik baletowy, Polskie Wydawnictwo Muzyczne, Warszawa 2008, 
  Tacjanna Wysocka, Dzieje baletu, Państwowy Instytut Wydawniczy, Warszawa 1970
 
  http://www.filmpolski.pl/fp/index.php?osoba=1146645
 Stanisław Szymański, Encyklopedia teatru polskiego. [online].

External links 
 Stanisław Szymański photographs in Polona

Artists from Kraków
Officers of the Order of Polonia Restituta
Recipients of the State Award Badge (Poland)
Burials at Powązki Military Cemetery
Polish male ballet dancers
Polish LGBT entertainers
1930 births
1999 deaths